The Join Australia Movement Party was a political party in New Zealand.  The party advocated political unity between New Zealand and Australia, and was led by Robin Caithness.

Caithness ran as a candidate for the party in the 2011 Botany by-election, receiving 45 votes. The party did not run any candidates in the 2011 election.

See also

References

External links
Official site (web archive copy)

Political parties in New Zealand
Political parties established in 2010
2010 establishments in New Zealand
Australia–New Zealand relations
Single-issue political parties in New Zealand